Kamal Mustafa (born 22 July 1991) is a Swedish footballer of Syrian descent who plays for IK Oddevold as a midfielder.

References

External links

Kamal Mustafa at Fotbolltransfers

1991 births
Living people
Association football midfielders
IFK Göteborg players
Syrianska FC players
Falkenbergs FF players
Utsiktens BK players
IK Oddevold players
Swedish footballers
Sweden youth international footballers
Allsvenskan players
Superettan players
Ettan Fotboll players